Norman E. Sjoman    (born July 6, 1944, Mission City) is known as author of the 1996 book The Yoga Tradition of the Mysore Palace, which contains an English translation of the yoga section of Sritattvanidhi, a 19th-century treatise by the Maharaja of Mysore, Krishnaraja Wodeyar III  (b. 1794 - d. 1868).  This book contributes an original view on the history and development of the teaching traditions behind modern asanas.   According to Sjoman, a majority of the tradition of teaching yoga as exercise, spread primarily through the teachings of B. K. S. Iyengar and his students, "appears to be distinct from the philosophical or textual tradition [of hatha yoga], and does not appear to have any basis as a [genuine] tradition as there is no textual support for the asanas taught and no lineage of teachers."

Education 

Sjoman studied at the University of British Columbia and  Stockholm University before obtaining a PhD from the Centre of Advanced Studies in Sanskrit at Pune University, and a pandit degree from the Mysore Maharaja's Mahapathasala. Sjoman spent 14 years in India studying four different shastras in Sanskrit, with several pandits.

From 1970 to 1976 Sjoman studied yoga under B.K.S. Iyengar.

The Yoga Tradition of the Mysore Palace 

In the mid 1980s, while doing research at the Mysore Palace, Sjoman made copies of the yoga section of the Sritattvanidhi, a "colossal" illustrated compendium, authored in the 19th century in Karnataka by the then Maharaja. The book included diagrams of 122 yoga asanas. Unlike the few other known historical yoga treatises, the emphasis was solely on the physical activity. Some appeared based on Indian wrestling and other gymnastic exercises, in that aspect more closely resembling modern yoga as exercise forms such as Ashtanga Vinyasa Yoga. Both B. K. S. Iyengar and Pattabhi Jois, who are major influences on modern yoga forms, themselves studied under teacher Tirumalai Krishnamacharya at the Mysore Palace in the 1930s. Sjoman further researched Krishnamacharya, finding several writings in the palace library. Sjoman discovered that the royal family, in the early 1900s, had employed a British gymnast to train the young princes. So, when Krishnamacharya arrived in the 1920s to start a yoga school, his schoolroom was the former gymnasium complete with ropes. Sjoman argues that several exercises detailed in a purposely written western gymnastics manual were incorporated into Krishnamacharya's syllabus, resulting in his vinyasa style, and further passed on to Iyengar and Jois. The Yoga Tradition of the Mysore Palace was published in 1996 including the 122 asana illustrations and extracts from the gymnastics manual. Naturally, the radical, perhaps heretical, idea that some of the practice of modern yoga as exercise is based on something as mundane as British gymnastics caused a stir in the yoga world.

Publications 
An Introduction to South Indian Music (with H.V. Dattatreya) Saraswati Project, Netherlands. 1986 
The Yoga Tradition of the Mysore Palace Abhinav Publications. New Delhi, India. 1996, 1999. .
A South Indian Treatise on the Kamasastra (with Swami Sivapriyananda). Abhinav Publications. New Delhi, India. 2000. .
Yoga Touchstone (with H.V. Dattatreya). Black Lotus Books. Calgary, Canada. 2004.  
Artists in Mysore (under the pseudonym Naramani Somanath). Black Lotus Books. Calgary, Canada. 2006.  
Dead Birds (with H.V. Dattatreya on accompanying DVD). Black Lotus Books. Calgary, Canada. 2007.  
Art: The Dark Side. Black Lotus Books. Calgary, Canada. 2010.  
Yogasutracintamani. Black Lotus Books, Calgary, Canada. 2013.

See also

 Joseph Alter – anthropologist, author of Yoga in Modern India
 Mark Singleton - yoga scholar-practitioner, author of Yoga Body, which further explores the role of Mysore in the development of yoga as exercise

References

External links
 Website
 In Perpetual Motion: A Conversation with Norman Sjoman PhD on Yoga, Art and a Personal Sense of Order

1944 births
Living people
Yoga scholars